The 1906 Utah Agricultural Aggies football team was an American football team that represented Utah Agricultural College (later renamed Utah State University) during the 1906 college football season. In their fifth and final season under head coach George P. Campbell, the Aggies compiled a 3–1 record but were outscored by a total of 51 to 38.

Schedule

References

Utah Agricultural
Utah State Aggies football seasons
Utah Agricultural Aggies football